Ira Stoll (born 1972) is managing editor of Education Next, an education policy journal based at the Harvard Kennedy School. He is editor of FutureOfCapitalism.com, a columnist for the Algemeiner, and he writes a column that appears at The New York Sun, Reason, Newsmax, the New Boston Post, and the Las Vegas Review-Journal. He was vice president and managing editor of the daily newspaper, The New York Sun, which was published from 2002 to 2008. He founded Smartertimes.com. Previously, he served as Washington correspondent and managing editor of The Forward and as North American editor of the Jerusalem Post. He is a graduate of Worcester Academy and Harvard University, where he graduated from in 1994 and served as president of the Crimson.

Bibliography

 Samuel Adams: A Life (2008)
 JFK, Conservative (2013)

References

External links
 FutureOfCapitalism.com
 Ira Stoll's columns in The New York Sun
 Ira Stoll's columns in The Algemeiner
 Ira Stoll's articles at Education Next

1972 births
American male journalists
Living people
Worcester Academy alumni
The New York Sun people
American newspaper editors
Place of birth missing (living people)
The Harvard Crimson people
21st-century American journalists
21st-century American businesspeople